Magomed Khasanovich Bibulatov (born August 22, 1988) is a Russian mixed martial artist currently fighting for ACA in the Bantamweight division. He competed in the flyweight division in Ultimate Fighting Championship. He is the former World Series of Fighting Flyweight Champion. He is the former ACA Bantamweight Champion. He is ranked #1 in the ACA bantamweight rankings.

Background
Bibulatov was born and raised in Achkhoy-Martan, Chechnya, Russia on August 22, 1988. He started to train karate at 6 years. After high school he went to Chechen State University for Law faculty. Then he moved to France and trained at Gladiator Fight Club. When he had 5 win streak in European MMA organizations, he came back to Russia and started representing Fight Club Akhmat with Ramzan Kadyrov's help.

Mixed martial arts career

Early career
Before joining the UFC Bibulatov amassed a record of 13-0 including wins against future UFC veteran Taylor Lapilus.

World Series of Fighting
Bibulatov faced Donavon Frelow  for the vacant flyweight title on October 7, 2015 at WSOF 24. He won the fight by unanimous decision and become a new WSOF flyweight champion.

Ultimate Fighting Championship
Bibulatov made his promotional debut for the UFC at UFC 210 against Jenel Lausa. He won the fight by unanimous decision.

Bibulatov faced John Moraga on October 7, 2017 at UFC 216. He lost the fight via knockout in the first round.

Bibulatov was scheduled to face Ulka Sasaki on April 21, 2018 at UFC Fight Night 128. However, he was removed from the card due to back injury.

Bibulatov faced promotional newcomer Rogério Bontorin on February 2, 2019 at UFC Fight Night 144. At weigh-ins, Bibulatov weighed one pound over the flyweight non-title fight limit of 126 and was fined 20% of his purse to Bontorin. Bibulatov lost the fight via split decision.

On May 7, 2019, it was reported that Bibulatov was released by UFC and signed with Absolute Championship Akhmat.

Absolute Championship Akhmat
As the first fight after his release from the UFC Bibulatov returned to ACA, facing Josiel Silva at ACA 100 on October 4, 2019. He won the bout via technical knockout in the second round.

Next, he faced Nikita Chistyakov at ACA 107 on July 24, 2020. He won the fight via first-round technical knockout.

Bibulatov faced Rodrigo Praia at ACA 112 on October 4, 2020. He won the fight via first-round knockout.

Bibulatov faced reigning champ Daniel Oliveira on March 26, 2021 at ACA 120: Oliveira vs. Bibulatov for the ACA Bantamweight Championship. After winning the first 4 rounds, Bibulatov survived a flurry in the last round to secure a unanimous decision, also winning the title in the process.

Bibulatov defended his title for the first time against Oleg Borisov at ACA 138 on March 27, 2022. He lost the bout and title via unanimous decision.

Bibulatov faced Charles Henrique in his first bout post title reign on December 23, 2022 at ACA 150, winning the close bout via split decision.

Championships and accomplishments
Absolute Championship Akhmat
ACA Bantamweight Championship (One time)
World Series of Fighting
WSOF Flyweight Championship (One time)
World Fighting Championship Akhmat
WFCA Flyweight Championship (One time)
Absolute Championship Berkut
ACB Bantamweight Grand-Prix winner

Mixed martial arts record

|-
|Win
|align=center|19–3
|Charles Henrique
|Decision (split)
|ACA 150: Koshkin vs. Reznikov
|
|align=center|3
|align=center|5:00
|Moscow, Russia
|
|-
|Loss
|align=center|18–3
|Oleg Borisov
|Decision (unanimous)
|ACA 138: Vagaev vs Gadzhidaudov
|
|align=center|5
|align=center|5:00
|Grozny, Russia
|
|-
|Win
|align=center|18–2
|Daniel Oliveira
|Decision (unanimous)
|ACA 120: Froes vs. Khasbulaev
|
|align=center|5
|align=center|5:00
|Saint Petersburg, Russia
|
|-
|Win
|align=center|17–2
|Rodrigo Praia
|KO (spinning back kick)
|ACA 112: Oliveira vs. Dudaev
|
|align=center|1
|align=center|1:11
|Grozny, Russia
|
|-
|Win
|align=center|16–2
|Nikita Chistyakov
|TKO (elbows and punches)
|ACA 107: Emelianenko vs. Ismailov
|
|align=center|1
|align=center|3:36
|Moscow, Russia
|
|-
|Win
|align=center|15–2
|Josiel Silva
|TKO (inside low kick)
|ACA 100: Zhamaldaev vs. Froes 2
|
|align=center|2
|align=center|2:40
|Grozny, Russia
|
|-
|Loss
|align=center|14–2
|Rogério Bontorin
|Decision (split)
|UFC Fight Night: Assunção vs. Moraes 2 
|
|align=center|3
|align=center|5:00
|Fortaleza, Brazil
|
|-
|Loss
|align=center|14–1
|John Moraga
|KO (punch) 
|UFC 216 
|
|align=center|1
|align=center|1:38
|Las Vegas, Nevada, United States
|
|-
|Win
|align=center|14–0
|Jenel Lausa
|Decision (unanimous)
|UFC 210
|
|align=center|3
|align=center|5:00
|Buffalo, New York, United States
|
|-
|Win
|align=center| 13–0
|Yunus Evloev
|Submission (guillotine choke)
|WFCA 30: Grand Prix Akhmat
|
|align=center|2
|align=center|0:40
|Grozny, Russia
|
|-
|Win
|align=center|12–0
|Giovanni Santos Jr.
|TKO (punches)
|WFCA 22: Grand Prix Akhmat
|
|align=center|1
|align=center|N/A
|Grozny, Russia
|
|-
|Win
|align=center|11–0
|Irmeson Cavalcante 
|Decision (unanimous)
|WFCA 16: Grand Prix Akhmat
|
|align=center|3
|align=center|5:00
|Grozny, Russia
|
|-
|Win
|align=center|10–0
|Donavon Frelow
|Decision (unanimous)
|WSOF 24
|
|align=center|5
|align=center|5:00
|Mashantucket, Connecticut, United States
|
|-
|Win
|align=center|9–0
|Eduardo Felipe
|KO (punch)
|WFCA 1
|
|align=center|1
|align=center|1:30
|Grozny, Russia
|
|-
|Win
|align=center|8–0
|Olivier Pastor
|Decision (unanimous)
|Absolute Championship Berkut 10
|
|align=center|3
|align=center|5:00
|Grozny, Russia
|
|-
|Win
|align=center|7–0
|Said Nurmagomedov
|Decision (unanimous)
|Absolute Championship Berkut: Grand Prix Berkut 9
|
|align=center|3
|align=center|5:00
|Grozny, Russia
|
|-
|Win
|align=center|6–0
|Shamil Shakhbiev
|Submission (armbar)
|Absolute Championship Berkut: Grand Prix Berkut 7
|
|align=center|1
|align=center|0:50
|Grozny, Russia
|
|-
|Win
|align=center|5–0
|Taylor Lapilus
|Decision (unanimous)
|GEFC: Urban Legend Prestige 4
|
|align=center|3
|align=center|5:00
|Villepinte, France
|
|-
|Win
|align=center|4–0
|Oscar Nave
|Decision (unanimous)
|WUFC 2013
|
|align=center|2
|align=center|5:00
|Lamego, Portugal
|
|-
|Win
|align=center|3–0
|Mickael Kanguichev
|Submission (armbar)
|WUFC 2013
|
|align=center|1
|align=center|3:37
|Lamego, Portugal
|
|-
|Win
|align=center|2–0
|Magomedrasul Omarov
|Submission (triangle choke)
|WUFC 2013
|
|align=center|1
|align=center|3:08
|Lamego, Portugal
|
|-
|Win
|align=center|1–0
|Mohamed Sadok
|Submission (armbar)
|GEFC: Urban Legend Prestige 2
|
|align=center|1
|align=center|3:36
|Villepinte, France
|

See also
 List of current UFC fighters

References

External links
 
 

1988 births
Living people
Russian Muslims
Russian male mixed martial artists
Chechen mixed martial artists
Sportspeople from Grozny
Russian people of Chechen descent
Flyweight mixed martial artists
Mixed martial artists utilizing karate
Ultimate Fighting Championship male fighters
Russian male karateka